Blumea - Journal of Plant Taxonomy and Plant Geography (Tijdschrift voor de Systematiek en de Geografie der Planten in Dutch) is a peer-reviewed journal of botany published by the National Herbarium of the Netherlands.

Except for a short period during World War II, Blumea has been published continuously since 1934. It deals with the taxonomy, morphology, anatomy, biogeography, and ecology of spermatophytes and cryptogams native to Southeast Asia, sub-Saharan Africa (excluding South Africa), and South America. Blumea is published three times a year, with each issue numbering around 600 pages.

References

External links
 Publication homepage
 Blumea online at IngentaConnect
 Blumea at SCImago Journal Rank
 Blumea at HathiTrust Digital Library
 Blumea at Botanical Scientific Journals

Publications established in 1934
Triannual journals
Botany journals
English-language journals